David Charles Godbey (born September 17, 1957) is the Chief United States district judge of the United States District Court for the Northern District of Texas.

Education and career

Godbey was born in Temple, Texas. He received a Bachelor of Science degree and Bachelor of Science in Electrical Engineering degree from Southern Methodist University in 1978 and a Juris Doctor from Harvard Law School in 1982. He was a law clerk to Judge Irving Loeb Goldberg of the United States Court of Appeals for the Fifth Circuit from 1982 to 1983. He was in private practice in Dallas from 1983 to 1994.  He was a judge on the 160th District Court, State of Texas from 1994 to 2002.

District court service

Godbey was nominated by President George W. Bush on January 23, 2002, to a seat vacated by Robert B. Maloney. He was confirmed by the United States Senate on August 1, 2002, and received his commission on August 2, 2002. He sits in Dallas. He became chief judge on September 6, 2022.

References

Sources

 John Council, "A Black Belt in a Black Robe", Texas Lawyer, July 27, 2009 (registration required)

1957 births
Living people
21st-century American judges
Harvard Law School alumni
Judges of the United States District Court for the Northern District of Texas
People from Temple, Texas
Southern Methodist University alumni
Texas state court judges
United States district court judges appointed by George W. Bush